The 1977 Virginia State Elections took place on Election Day, November 8, 1977, the same day as the Gubernatorial, Lieutenant gubernatorial, Attorney General and Virginia House of Delegates elections, which are always held in off-years. The only other statewide elections on the ballot were five government bond referendums, which were referred to the voters by the Virginia General Assembly.

Bond Question 1

The Educational Facilities Act allows the Commonwealth to sell a maximum of $86,475,000 dollars in bonds for the purpose of raising funds to pay for capital projects at state-supported colleges, universities, museums and other educational facilities.

Bond Question 2

Voters were asked the following question:

"Shall Chapter 651, Acts of the General Assembly of 1977, authorizing the issuance of general obligation bonds of the Commonwealth of Virginia in the maximum amount of $21,525,000 pursuant to Article X, Section 9(b) of the Constitution of Virginia for correctional facilities, take effect?"

Bond Question 3

Voters were asked the following question:

"Shall Chapter 652, Acts of the General Assembly of 1977, authorizing the issuance of general obligation bonds of the Commonwealth of Virginia in the maximum amount of $4,000,000 pursuant to Article X, Section 9(b) of the Constitution of Virginia for mental health facilities, take effect?"

Bond Question 4

The Parks and Recreational Facilities Act allows the Commonwealth to sell a maximum of $5,000,000 dollars in bonds for the purpose of raising funds to pay for capital projects at state-supported parks and recreational facilities.

Bond Question 5

Voters were asked the following question:

"Shall Chapter 654, Acts of the General Assembly of 1977, authorizing the issuance of general obligation bonds of the Commonwealth of Virginia in the maximum amount of $8,000,000 pursuant to Article X, Section 9(b) of the Constitution of Virginia for port facilities, take effect?"

References

1977 Virginia elections